The Committee for Civilian Aspects of Crisis Management, or CIVCOM, is an advisory body within the European Union dealing with civilian aspects of crisis management. The activities of CIVCOM therefore forms part of the Common Foreign and Security Policy (CFSP) of EU, and the civilian side of the Common Security and Defence Policy (CSDP). CIVCOM is composed of representatives of the EU member states.

The activities of CIVCOM for civilian CSDP tasks occur in parallel to the European Union Military Committee (EUMC) for military CDP tasks. Both EUMC and CIVCOM receive directions from, and report to the Political and Security Committee (PSC).

The decision to establish CIVCOM was taken in 2000 by the Council of the European Union.

References

External links 
PhD Thesis on Civilian ESDP - EU Civilian crisis management (University of Geneva, 2008, 441 p. in French), a comprehensive analysis of EU Civilian crisis management (Civilian ESDP)

Common Security and Defence Policy bodies of the Council of the European Union

PhD Thesis on Civilian ESDP - EU Civilian crisis management (University of Geneva, 2008, 441 p. in French)